Tiiu Aro (born June 18, 1952 in Kuressaare) is an Estonian physician and politician.

She is a former Minister of Social Affairs of Estonia, having served in that position from 1996 to 1999. Her aunt, Marta Kivi (born 6 February 1912) is the oldest known living person in Estonia.

From 1999 to 2009 she worked as Director General of the Estonian Health Inspection and on 1 January 2010 she became Director General of the Health Board.

References 

Government ministers of Estonia
People from Kuressaare
1952 births
Living people